3CLpro-1 is an antiviral drug related to rupintrivir which acts as a 3CL protease inhibitor and was originally developed for the treatment of human enterovirus 71. It is one of the most potent of a large series of compounds developed as inhibitors of the viral enzyme 3CL protease, with an in vitro IC50 of 200 nM. It also shows activity against coronavirus diseases such as SARS and MERS, and is under investigation as a potential treatment agent for the viral disease COVID-19.

See also 
 Carmofur
 Ebselen
 GC376
 GRL-0617
 Rupintrivir
 Theaflavin digallate

References 

Antiviral drugs
SARS-CoV-2 main protease inhibitors